Suratgarh Super Thermal Power Station is Rajasthan's first super thermal power station. It is located 27 km away from Suratgarh town in Ganganagar district. The power plant is operated by Rajasthan Rajya Vidyut Utpadan Nigam Ltd (RVUNL).  The power plant has 6 units that can produce 250 megawatt and 2 units can produce 660 MW.

Awards 
The plant received a gold shield on 8 August 2004 from Hon'ble President for consistently outstanding performance during the years 2000 to 2004. It also received a bronze shield from Hon' Prime Minister for outstanding performance during the years 2005 and 2006.

Installed capacity
Following is the unit wise capacity of the plant.

See also 

 Kota Super Thermal Power Plant
 Giral Lignite Power Plant
 Chhabra Thermal Power Plant
 Ramgarh Gas Thermal Power Station

References 

Coal-fired power stations in Rajasthan
Buildings and structures in Sri Ganganagar district
Energy infrastructure completed in 1998
1998 establishments in Rajasthan
20th-century architecture in India